Călin Moldovan may refer to:

 Călin Ion Moldovan, Romanian former footballer, who played as a midfielder, currently a football manager.
 Călin Cristian Moldovan, Romanian former footballer, who played as a goalkeeper, currently a football manager.